Puzdrino is a rural locality (a village) in Beryozovsky District, Perm Krai, Russia. The population was 113 as of 2010.

Geography 
Puzdrino is located 12 km northeast of  Beryozovka (the district's administrative centre) by road. Tuyasy is the nearest rural locality.

References 

Rural localities in Beryozovsky District, Perm Krai